The Cainiaceae are a family of (previously) two genera of fungi in the order Xylariales. The family was circumscribed by John C. Krug in 1979.

Genus Seynesia was added later to the family.

References

External links

Xylariales
Ascomycota families